Vice Versa is a 1988 American comedy film directed by Brian Gilbert and starring Judge Reinhold and Fred Savage. It is the fourth film adaptation of F. Anstey's 1882 novel of the same name, following the British films released in 1916, 1937 and 1948.

Plot

In Thailand, a pair of thieves steal an ancient skull from a Buddhist monastery.

Marshall Seymour is vice president of a Chicago department store in charge of buying. He is divorced and has an 11-year-old son named Charlie, for whom he has little time. He and his girlfriend Sam visit Thailand to purchase exotic merchandise. At the same time, an art thief named Turk tries to purchase an ornate skull but must find a way to smuggle it out of the country. He places it with one of Marshall's purchases so that he and his accomplice Lillian Brookmeyer can make a switch.

When Marshall returns, he takes Charlie for a few days while his mother Robyn and stepfather Cliff are on vacation. While holding the skull, they enter into an argument about how they wish that they could be in each other's bodies. It is revealed that the skull possesses supernatural magical powers, and they suddenly find that they have switched bodies. After the initial shock, they realize they must live out their lives as each other, and Marshall heads to school to deal with tests, bullies and hockey practice while Charlie assumes his father's role as a vice president from an 11-year-old's viewpoint.

One night, Charlie and Sam attend a concert that Marshall had forbidden him to attend. The date improves Marshall's relationship with Sam.

Marshall and Charlie visit the museum and talk with Professor Kerschner, who explains the true nature of the skull and wishes to show it to a lama before returning it to them. Robyn arrives home earlier than expected and, not knowing what has transpired, is furious at the sight of Marshall (as Charlie) drinking a martini.

After failing to reacquire the skull, the thieves embark on a mission to steal it. Charlie learns from Marshall's boss Avery that he has called a meeting to pull the plug on Marshall's business. He collects Marshall at school and, after purchasing a device that will allow them to communicate with each other, Marshall listens in on the boardroom meeting and instructs Charlie as to what he should say. However, Turk kidnaps Marshall, leaving Charlie to fend for himself in the boardroom. No longer able to speak eloquently, he rises and speaks out in Marshall's defense before leaving the meeting.

With Turk and Lillian holding Marshall for ransom, Charlie tries to retrieve the skull from the lama. Marshall attempts to explain to the thieves that he is not himself, and that he and Charlie have switched bodies because of the skull; while Turk believes him, Lillian dismisses the story as a ploy. When Charlie finally arrives with the skull, the switch is made and Marshall is returned. However, he and Charlie rush to reacquire the skull so that they can switch themselves back. They manage to catch the thieves just after they have accidentally switched bodies, and they take the skull back from them, leaving Turk and Lillian in their new bodies as punishment.

The police arrest Charlie for possible kidnapping and Cliff posts his bail. Charlie tells him that Robyn is not aware of what has happened. Sam appears and reports that Marshall still has a job despite Charlie's outburst. He asks Sam to take him home so that he can give Charlie a present. On the way, Charlie proposes marriage to Sam.

Charlie climbs through his bedroom window and he and Marshall touch the skull, successfully switching back into their own bodies. Marshall then goes to see Sam while Charlie listens to their conversation about the proposal. Though initially caught off guard, Marshall relents and embraces the proposal that Charlie had made for him.

Cast

Reception
The film received mixed reviews. Roger Ebert was its most ardent champion; his review in the Chicago Sun-Times opened with these two paragraphs:  Less enthusiastic was Michael Wilmington of the Los Angeles Times, who wrote that it "may be a better film than Like Father, Like Son, largely because of the direction and Savage's performance, but it's still a disappointment. British director Brian Gilbert showed tremendous talent in his 1985 Sharma and Beyond, which he also wrote. Here, producer-writers Ian La Fresnais and Dick Clement (Otley, Water) give us mostly a collection of obvious gags, traipsing wheezingly from one point to another." He added:  Janet Maslin of The New York Times wrote that "Luck doesn't get any worse than it has for Vice Versa, the twin of an identically plotted film released only a few months previously. Originality isn't a factor for either this or Like Father, Like Son, since they both owe a good deal to the earlier Freaky Friday, but timeliness undoubtedly is. All things being equal, neither of these films is appreciably better than the other; the difference isn't one of quality but of style. Like Father, Like Son had Dudley Moore, who brought a certain sly sophistication to the role of a grown man with the mind of a small boy, while Vice Versa, which opens today at Loews Astor Plaza and other theaters, has Judge Reinhold, who concentrates more on the innocent silliness of the situation. Both of them have found gentle humor in the plight of a grown man sent off to junior high school while his carefree, irresponsible, career-wrecking son fills in for him on the job." 

Internationally, Derek Malcolm wrote in The Guardian that "the film opens well, since father has divorced his wife and has little time for his son, making the sudden transformation the more piquant And Reinhold plays himself as a boy with considerable mimic skill. But the film, though scripted by Dick Clement and Ian La Frenais, never strays very far from orthodox Hollywood comedy, though put together with enough skill to be fairly watchable throughout." David Robinson of the London newspaper The Times wrote: 

The film has a score of 50% on Rotten Tomatoes from 16 critics.

It grossed $13,664,060 in the United States during its theatrical run.

In popular culture
The film has been mentioned in episodes of Clerks: The Animated Series, Community and Difficult People.

The Rooster Teeth card-based party game Million Dollars, But... references the film in a card included in its 1980s theme pack.

See also 
 Body swap appearances in media (film)

References

External links
 
 
 
 
 Based on the novel by F. Anstey - free from manybooks.net

1980s fantasy comedy films
1980s Christmas films
1988 comedy films
1988 films
American Christmas films
American fantasy comedy films
Body swapping in films
Columbia Pictures films
Films about families
Films based on British novels
Films set in Chicago
Films set in Thailand
Films shot in Chicago
Films scored by David Shire
Films with screenplays by Dick Clement
Films with screenplays by Ian La Frenais
Films about father–son relationships
Films directed by Brian Gilbert
1980s English-language films
1980s American films